The Portland Gold Award is given annually by the Portland Rose Society to new rose cultivars that demonstrate exceptional performance in the Pacific Northwest of the United States. The first award was given in 1919 by the city of Portland, Oregon.

History
The Portland Rose Society began as an informal rose society in 1888, organized by Georgiana Pittock, wife of the first Oregonian publisher, Henry Pittock. The first rose competition was held in Pittock's garden. She had been inspired to form the gardening club after a holiday in England, where she toured rose gardens and attended a rose show. The next year, Pittock turned her backyard rose competition into a fundraiser for her church. She added a judging tent to her garden and charged admission to the event. This annual event would later include a city parade, where local gardeners would strip their gardens of all but competition roses to decorate cars, horses, floats and wagons. From these early beginnings, the Portland Rose Festival was born. The group officially established the Portland Rose Society as a formal gardening organization in 1907, and established the annual tradition of a judged, flower competition. It is the oldest and largest rose society in the United States.

Portland Gold Award winners
This is a partial list of Portland Gold Award winners.

See also
International Rose Test Garden
List of Award of Garden Merit roses
Rose Hall of Fame
All-America Rose Selections
ADR rose

Notes

References

 

Lists of cultivars
Plant awards